Seminar III: Zozobra is the third studio album by Old Man Gloom, released in 2001 by Hydra Head Records imprint Tortuga Recordings.

Track listing

Personnel
Caleb Scofield – bass guitar and backing vocals
Santos "Hanno" Montano –  drumming, backup vocals, data backup, Mexican vibes, viral marketing
Luke Scarola – effects  and Electronics
Nate Newton – guitar and backing vocals
Aaron Turner – guitar and vocals

Old Man Gloom albums
2001 albums
Albums produced by Kurt Ballou